Ricardo Thomas (born 30 May 1990) is a Jamaican international footballer who plays for Dunbeholden, as a left back.

Career

Club 
Born in Kingston, Thomas has played club football for Greenwich Town, Newlands, Molynes United, Maverley Hughenden and Waterhouse. In 2022, Thomas signed for Dunbeholden.

International
He made his international debut for Jamaica in 2018.

References

1990 births
Living people
Jamaican footballers
Jamaica international footballers
Molynes United F.C. players
Waterhouse F.C. players
National Premier League players
Association football fullbacks
Maverley Hughenden F.C. players
Dunbeholden F.C. players